This is a list of wars involving the Republic of Kenya.

References

 
Kenya
Wars